The Service Star (French Étoile de service) was a civil decoration in the Congo Free State (and later the Belgian Congo) created by a decree of the king-sovereign, Leopold II, on 16 January 1889. It was given to those non-natives who faithfully and honorably completed a term of service in the Congo. It was the second decoration in terms of precedence after the Order of the African Star, introduced seventeen days earlier.

The award consisted of a five-sided silver star 30 millimetres in diameter. On one side, in the centre, was a smaller five-sided gold star, while on the other was the Free State motto, Travail et progrès (work and progress). It came with a blue ribbon with horizontal silver bars attached to indicate the number of terms of service in the Congo. Vice-Governor General Paul Costermans, for example, wore the star with four bars.

References

Awards established in 1889
Colonial orders of chivalry
Orders, decorations, and medals of Belgium
Long service medals
1889 establishments in the Congo Free State